In 1794, after the onset of the French Revolutionary Wars the British government contemplated an invasion of Île de France (Mauritius). To that end it detained at Portsmouth a large number of East Indiamen sailing for the British East India Company (EIC). The government cancelled the invasion and in May 1794 released the vessels it had detained. When it did so, it paid demurrage for having delayed the vessels' voyages to the Indies and China.

The British government finally invaded and captured Île de France (Mauritius) in 1810. This time the transport vessels the British government hired were mostly "country ships", vessels registered in ports of British India such as Bombay and Calcutta. It also hired a small number of EIC vessels that had already arrived at Madras or Calcutta.

Citations

Age of Sail merchant ships of England
Ships of the British East India Company
Lists of sailing ships